The City of San Luis Obispo Historic Resources consists of buildings and sites designated by the City of San Luis Obispo, California, as historic resources.

A map displaying the locations of San Luis Obispo's designated historic resources can be viewed by clicking "OpenStreetMap" in the template found to the right below.

Legal foundation and purpose of designation
The designation of historic resources in City of San Luis Obispo is the responsibility of the city's Cultural Heritage Committee (CHC), a group with seven members appointed by the City Council. The CHC is broadly responsible for researching, identifying, and protecting historic buildings, archaeological sites and cultural features. Under the City's Historic Preservation Ordinance, historic resources must exhibit "a high level of historic integrity," be at least 50 years old, and satisfy specified architectural or historic criteria, including associations with a notable architect, architectural design or style, historic person, historic event, or physical integrity.

In 2013, the City also published a Citywide Historic Context Statement which places the City's historic resources "in the appropriate historic, social, and architectural context" in order to establish "the relationship between an area’s physical environment and its broader history." The Historic Context Statement is available on the City's website.

The City has also published "Historic Preservation Program Guidelines" which are also available on the City's website.

Overlap with other registries
Three of the City's designated historic resources have also been designated as California Historic Landmarks.  They are: Mission San Luis Obispo de Tolosa (CHL 325); Dallidet Adobe (CHL 720); and Ah Louis Store (CHL 802).

In addition, eight of the City's designated historic resources have been listed on the National Register of Historic Places (NRHP).  They are: Myron Angel House (NRHP 11/22/82); Pacific Coast Railway Company Grain Warehouse (NRHP 6/23/88); Robert Jack House (NRHP 4/13/92); Tribune-Republic Building (NRHP 6/24/93); San Luis Obispo Carnegie Library (NRHP 3/30/95); Ah Louis Store (NRHP 3/26/08); William Shipsey House (NRHP 3/31/10); and Monday Club of San Luis Obispo (NRHP 5/10/16).

There are also two sites listed on the NRHP but not included in the City's register of historic resources. They are The Powerhouse (NRHP 7/30/93) on the CalPoly campus and the San Luis Obispo Octagon Barn (NRHP 1/15/14).

San Luis Obispo Historic Resources

San Luis Obispo Historic Districts

See also
 National Register of Historic Places listings in San Luis Obispo County, California
 California Historical Landmarks in San Luis Obispo County, California

References

San Luis Obispo
San Luis Obispo
San Luis Obispo
San Luis Obispo